The Breaking Point (also known as The Great Armored Car Swindle) is a 1961 British crime film directed by Lance Comfort and starring Peter Reynolds, Dermot Walsh, Joanna Dunham and Lisa Gastoni.

Cast
 Peter Reynolds - Eric Winlatter
 Dermot Walsh - Robert Wade
 Joanna Dunham - Cherry Winlatter
 Lisa Gastoni - Eva
 Jack Allen - Ernest Winlatter
 Brian Cobby - Peter de Savory
 Arnold Diamond - Telling
 Eric Corrie - Wilson
 Desmond Cullum-Jones - Evans
 Geoffrey Denton - Debt Collector
 Richard Golding - Mintos
 John G. Heller - Mel
 Gertan Klauber - Lofty
 John Lawrence - Security Officer
 Mercia Mansfield - Ernest's Secretary
 Charles Russell - Cappel

References

External links

1961 films
Films directed by Lance Comfort
1961 crime films
British crime films
1960s English-language films
1960s British films